The discography of DJ Funkmaster Flex consists of six albums and twelve singles.

Albums

Singles

Other charted songs

References 

Hip hop discographies
Discographies of American artists